Agarawala Grama Niladhari Division is a Grama Niladhari Division of the Devinuwara Divisional Secretariat of Matara District of Southern Province, Sri Lanka. It has Grama Niladhari Division Code 448C.

Agarawala is surrounded by the Uda Aparekka, Beddegammedda, Kokawala, Kekanadura East, Deeyagaha East and Palle Aparekka Grama Niladhari Divisions.

Demographics

Ethnicity 
The Agarawala Grama Niladhari Division has a Sinhalese majority (100.0%). In comparison, the Devinuwara Divisional Secretariat (which contains the Agarawala Grama Niladhari Division) has a Sinhalese majority (98.4%)

Religion 
The Agarawala Grama Niladhari Division has a Buddhist majority (99.7%). In comparison, the Devinuwara Divisional Secretariat (which contains the Agarawala Grama Niladhari Division) has a Buddhist majority (98.1%)

References 

Grama Niladhari Divisions of Devinuwara Divisional Secretariat